Anatoliy Afanasyevich Turusin (8 May 1939 – 21 February 2022) was a Russian politician. A member of the Communist Party of the Soviet Union and later the Agrarian Party of Russia, he served in the Congress of People's Deputies of Russia from 1990 to 1993 and the State Duma from 1994 to 1999. He died in Irkutsk on 21 February 2022, at the age of 82.

References

1939 births
2022 deaths
20th-century Russian politicians
21st-century Russian politicians
Communist Party of the Soviet Union members
Agrarian Party of Russia politicians
First convocation members of the State Duma (Russian Federation)
Second convocation members of the State Duma (Russian Federation)
People from Irkutsk Oblast